The Philippine Senate Committee on Finance is a standing committee of the Senate of the Philippines.

Jurisdiction 
According to the Rules of the Senate, the committee handles all matters relating to:

 Funds for the expenditures of the national government and for the payment of public indebtedness
 Auditing of accounts and expenditures of the national government
 Claims against the government
 Inter-governmental revenue sharing
 In general, all matters relating to public expenditures

Members, 18th Congress 
Based on the Rules of the Senate, the Senate Committee on Finance has 20 members.

The President Pro Tempore, the Majority Floor Leader, and the Minority Floor Leader are ex officio members.

The Finance Committee is further split into subcommittees, 11 in total as of the 18th Congress, each headed by the committee chairperson or a committee vice chairperson.

Here are the members of the committee in the 18th Congress as of September 24, 2020: The subcommittee headed by the chairperson or a vice chairperson is also indicated:

Committee secretaries:

 Main committee: Niniveh B. Lao / Arturo I. Mojica / Legislative Budget Research and Monitoring Office
 Subcommittee A: Niniveh B. Lao / Arturo I. Mojica
 Subcommittee B: Philip M. Lina / Maria Clarinda R. Mendoza
 Subcommittee C: Charlyne Claire Fuentes-Olay
 Subcommittee D: Ma. Lourdes A. Juan-Alzate
 Subcommittee E: Elizabeth F. Agas
 Subcommittee F: Horace R. Cruda
 Subcommittee G: Jose Marcos Babia
 Subcommittee H: Maria Gylissa Love J. Morales
 Subcommittee I: Dana Paula Mendiola-Alberto
 Subcommittee J: Ambrosio M. Manaligod, Jr.
 Subcommittee K: Harold Ian V. Bartolome

See also 

 List of Philippine Senate committees

References 

Finance
Finance in the Philippines